Mahesh Bhupathi and Pavel Vízner were the defending champions. They were both present but did not compete together.
Bhupathi partnered with Mark Knowles, but lost in the quarterfinals to Lukáš Dlouhý and Leander Paes
Vízner partnered with Martin Damm, but lost in the second round to Mario Ančić and Jeff Coetzee.

Daniel Nestor and Nenad Zimonjić won in the final 6–2, 4–6, [10–6], against Bob Bryan and Mike Bryan.

Seeds
All seeds receive a bye into the second round.

Draw

Finals

Top half

Bottom half

External links
 Draw

Masters - Doubles